The Religious Action Center (RAC) is the political and legislative outreach arm of Reform Judaism in the United States. The Religious Action Center is operated under the auspices of the Commission on Social Action of Reform Judaism, a joint body of the Central Conference of American Rabbis and the Union for Reform Judaism. It was founded in 1961.

Consistent with the political and social concerns of Reform Judaism, the Religious Action Center played a key role in important political events of the American civil rights movement, the struggles of Soviet Jewry, as well as the ongoing humanitarian crisis in Darfur. It hosted several meetings at which the groundwork for the various pieces of legislation, including the Civil Rights Acts and Voting Rights Acts, were laid. It also shielded civil rights marchers who were attacked by District of Columbia police.

Aside from its community organizing and direct advocacy work, the Religious Action Center has also been a hub of social justice programming for the Reform Jewish community. The L'Taken seminar series has given thousands of young Jews the opportunity to visit Washington, D.C., and learn about public policy and Jewish values. The Religious Action Center also hosted a Passover seder for the Dalai Lama in the late 1990s.  As part of the weekend, students celebrate Havdalah at the Jefferson Memorial.

Rabbi David Saperstein served at Religious Action Center from 1974 to 2015, as director and chief legal counsel. In that role he was recognized by Newsweek Magazine in 2009 as "the most influential rabbi in the country". On July 28, 2014, President Barack Obama nominated Saperstein to be the first non-Christian to hold the post of United States Ambassador-at-Large for International Religious Freedom. In December 2014, Saperstein's appointment to the post won U.S. Senate confirmation.

In January 2015, Saperstein was succeeded at Religious Action Center by Rabbi Jonah Pesner. Pesner grew up in New York, and served as a congregational rabbi in Boston. He created "Just Congregations" in 2006, a program that teaches congregations to join in interfaith advocacy for social justice issues. Pesner will continue to serve as Senior Vice President of the Union for Reform Judaism, a post he has held since 2011. The Washington Post described the director position at Religious Action Center as being "the closest thing to being American Jews' lobbyist on mostly non-Israel issues." Those issues have included health care, prison reform, marriage equality and reproductive freedom, while Pesner expects to increase the organization's focus on racial and economic disparities.
 
Because Religious Action Center's priorities most closely approximate those of the Democratic Party, Religious Action Center has, at times, struggled in an increasingly polarized Congress. Saperstein's close alignment with the Democratic Party at times earned him suspicion of the Republican Party, while Pesner will represent a Jewish community at a time when Gallup polls show Jewish loyalty to the Democratic Party has dropped from 71% in 2008 to 61% in 2014.

References

External links

 
Guide to Religious Action Center for Reform Judaism Soviet Jewry Collection at the American Jewish Historical Society, New York.

Dupont Circle
Embassy Row
Lobbying organizations in the United States
Organizations based in Washington, D.C.
Organizations established in 1961
Union for Reform Judaism